Linda Dallmann (born 2 September 1994) is a German professional footballer who plays for Frauen-Bundesliga club Bayern Munich and the Germany national team.

Club career
In 2019, Dallmann signed to join Bayern Munich. She helped her team win the Frauen-Bundesliga in the 2021-2022 season.

International career
She was first selected for the German national team in September 2016 by national coach Steffi Jones, and made her official debut on 16 September 2016 in Moscow, in the team's 4–0 win over Russia in a European Championship qualifier. She also participated during the 2017 European Football Championship in the Netherlands in two of the national team's total of four matches and the 2019 FIFA World Cup in France, under Martina Voss-Tecklenburg.

Dallmann was named in the Germany squad for UEFA European Championship 2022.

Career statistics

Scores and results list Germany's goal tally first, score column indicates score after each Dallmann goal.

Honours
Bayern Munich
 Bundesliga: 2020–21

Germany U17
 UEFA Women's Under-17 Championship third place: 2011
Germany U20
 FIFA U-20 Women's World Cup: 2014
Germany

 UEFA Women's Championship runner-up: 2022

References

External links

1994 births
Living people
People from Wesel (district)
Sportspeople from Düsseldorf (region)
Women's association football midfielders
Association football midfielders
German women's footballers
Germany women's international footballers
SGS Essen players
Bayer 04 Leverkusen (women) players
FC Bayern Munich (women) players
Frauen-Bundesliga players
Footballers from North Rhine-Westphalia
2019 FIFA Women's World Cup players
UEFA Women's Euro 2022 players
UEFA Women's Euro 2017 players